Robert Long (9 November 1846 – 6 August 1924) was an English cricketer.  Long was a right-handed batsman who bowled right-arm fast.  He was born at Richmond, Surrey.

Long made two first-class appearances for Surrey in 1870 against the Marylebone Cricket Club at Lord's, and Lancashire at Old Trafford.  He batted four times in these two matches, being dismissed for a duck each time he batted.  He also went wicketless in both matches.

He died at Enfield, Middlesex on 6 August 1924.

References

External links
Robert Long at ESPNcricinfo
Robert Long at CricketArchive

1846 births
1924 deaths
People from Richmond, London
English cricketers
Surrey cricketers